Silvanus Bevan FRS (1691–8 June 1765) was an apothecary, who founded the London firm of Allen & Hanburys.

Biography

Early life
Silvanus Bevan was born in 1691 in Swansea, into a prosperous Welsh Quaker family. His father, who died in 1725, was also called Silvanus. His mother was Jane Bevan (née Phillips). He had a younger brother, Timothy 1704-1786). He left Swansea as a young man, and moved to Cheapside, in London.

Career
He obtained his "Freedom" from the Worshipful Society of Apothecaries in 1715 having served his seven years' apprenticeship with Thomas Mayleigh. He established his Pharmacy at Number Two Plough Court, Lombard Street in one of whose rooms Alexander Pope, the poet, had been born in 1688. William Cookworthy was one of his apprentices.

His business prospered, and in 1725 he was joined by his younger brother, Timothy (1704–1786). Timothy continued the Plough Court Pharmacy after his brother's retirement, and was succeeded by his son, Joseph Gurney Bevan (1753–1814). In the nineteenth century, under William Allen and the Hanbury family, Allen & Hanburys became one of the leading pharmaceutical companies in London.

In 1725, he was elected a Fellow of the Royal Society, on the proposal of Isaac Newton. In 1743 his letter entitled “An Account of an Extraordinary Case of the Bones of a Woman Growing Soft and Flexible”, was printed in their Philosophical Transactions. It describes his findings having performed a post-mortem examination.

He was a skilled carver of ivory and several busts of well-known men are still in existence (he sent one to Lord Cobham, when he was seeking likenesses for statues for his garden at Stowe House.

After he retired his interest in Welsh antiquities brought him into contact with Richard Morris. There are references to him in the Morris Letters He was described as being a dilettante, a collector of fossils, curios, books and paintings and a keen gardener. Although he spoke Welsh badly, in 1762 he was elected a member of the Cymmrodorion.

Personal life
On 9 November 1715 he married Elizabeth, the daughter of Daniel Quare, the royal clockmaker, at a Friends' meeting-house in the City. His wedding was attended by Sarah, Duchess of Marlborough, Lord Finch, Lady Cartwright, William Penn, the Venetian ambassador and his wife. Elizabeth died soon after their marriage in giving birth to a son, who lived but a few hours. Silvanus subsequently married Martha Heathcote, the daughter of Gilbert Heathcote (1664-1719), a Quaker physician to King William III of England. They had no children.

Death
He died in Hackney on 5 June 1765, and was buried at the Bunhill Fields burial-ground.

Notes
There were three prominent Silvanus Bevans in the family.
 Silvanus (I) (1661–1725) the father of the subject of this entry was a burgess of the City of Swansea.
 Silvanus (II) (1691–1765) the apothecary, and
 Silvanus (III) (1743–1830), son of Timothy Bevan, the brother of Silvanus Bevan (II), was one of the founders of Barclay's Bank and partner of Thrale's Anchor Brewery. He was a grandson of Silvanus (I) and the great grandfather of Robert Polhill Bevan, the artist.

Further reading 
 The Monthly Record, 15 March 1873, No 46, Vol IV.
 (The Morris Letters) The letters of Lewis, Richard, William and John Morris of Anglesey, ed. J. H. Davies, 2 vols. (1907–09).
 Audrey Nona Gamble, A History of the Bevan Family (1923).
 "The Quaker family of Bevan", Journal of the Friends' Historical Society, 22 (1925).
 A. A. Locke and A. Esdaile, Plough Court: the story of a notable pharmacy, 1715–1927, rev. E. C. Cripps (1927).
 Desmond Chapman-Huston and E. C. Cripps, Through a City Archway: the story of Allen and Hanburys, 1715–1954 (1954).
 John Nickalls, 'Some Quaker Portraits, Certain and Uncertain', in The Journal of the Friends Historical Society, Supplement no. 29, 1958, 10–2.
 Hugh Tait, 'Wedgwood, Flaxman, and an English eighteenth-century portrait carver, Silvanus Bevan.' Proceedings of the Wedgwood Society, No 3, 1959. pp. 126–32.
 J. Burnby, ‘A study of the English apothecary from 1660 to 1760’, Medical History, suppl. 3 (1983) [whole issue].
 Geoffrey Tweedale, At the Sign of the Plough: 275 years of Allen & Hanburys and the British pharmaceutical industry, 1715–1990 (1990) .
 Jonathan Marsden, 'William Penn and Sir Francis Dashwood's Sawmill'. Georgian Group Journal, vol. VIII, 1998, pp. 143–50.

References

1691 births
1765 deaths
People from Swansea
British pharmacists
Welsh Quakers
British Quakers
Fellows of the Royal Society
Welsh apothecaries
Silvanus